Ranchuelo is a town and municipality in the Villa Clara Province of Cuba. It was founded in 1734 and has a municipal population of 59,062, of which about 16,804 in the town itself.

History
Originally named Boca de Ranchuelo, the settlement was founded by Dionisio Consuegra on October 1, 1734. In 1856 it was linked to the national rail network, and in 1879 gained the municipal status.

Geography

The town is divided into the barrios of Norte, Poza de la China, Sitio Viejo and Sur. The municipality counts the town proper (with 16,804 inhabitants) and the consejos populares (i.e. "people's councils", mainly villages and hamlets) of Carlos Caraballo, Castaño, Conyedo, Diez de Octubre, Esperanza, Horqueta-Delicias, Ifraín Alfonso (also known as Central Santa María), Jicotea, Osvaldo Herrera (also known as Pastora), Rancho Grande-Jagua and San Juan de los Yeras. 

Ranchuelo is 7 km from San Juan de los Yeras, 9 from Esperanza, 16 from Cruces, 28 from Santa Clara, 43 from Cienfuegos and 256 from Havana. It borders with the municipalities of Santo Domingo, Cifuentes, Santa Clara, Manicaragua, Cruces and Lajas.

Demographics
In 2004, the municipality of Ranchuelo had a population of 59,062.

Transport
Ranchuelo is served by the A1 motorway at the homonym exit, also known as "Ranchuelo-Cienfuegos". It counts a railway station on the Santa Clara-Cienfuegos line, that is also the western terminus of a freight line to Mataguá.

Esperanza, the most populated municipal hamlet, is crossed in the middle by the "Carretera Central" state highway.

Notable people
Samuel Feijóo (1914-1992), singer, born in San Juan de los Yeras
María Dámasa Jova Baró (1890-1940), writer, educator and feminist

See also
Municipalities of Cuba
List of cities in Cuba

References

External links

 Ranchuelo on EcuRed
 (historical info on guije.com)

Populated places in Villa Clara Province
1734 establishments in North America
Populated places established in 1734
1734 establishments in the Spanish Empire